Auburn, Wisconsin may refer to:

Auburn, Chippewa County, Wisconsin, a town
Auburn, Fond du Lac County, Wisconsin, a town